The Nepal national under-17 football team is the under-17 football team of Nepal. The team is controlled by the All Nepal Football Association and is a member of the Asian Football Confederation.

History

Early years
In the mid-1980s, FIFA provided financial assistance and sent a number of coaches to help Nepal launch its first youth programme, which was geared towards spotting talent at the grassroots level (such as in schools, for example) and providing young players with the necessary know-how, both on and off the pitch. The initial five-year plan helped half the players groomed under the first youth programme to find a place in the national side, and the team that won the 2 gold medals in the first and sixth South Asian Federation (SAF) Games mostly consisted of the players from that youth programme.

Youth investment
ANFA asked FIFA for financial assistance to check the downslide of Nepalese domestic football and in 1998, FIFA agreed to donate funds through its Financial Assistance Programme (FAP), thereby allowing ANFA to construct a secretariat along with a football pitch and a hostel in Kathmandu to launch its youth development programme. The two-year intensive training period for the youth players selected in 1998 produced a number of skilful players, who recently participated in the ninth South Asian Games (Pakistan, 29 March - 5 April). The same team had earlier topped its group in the Asian Cup preliminary round in March 2004.

However, despite reaching the finals tournament of the 2000 AFC U-17 Championship in Vietnam, Nepal refused to participate in a biological age test, and as a result was banned from the 2002 AFC U-17 Championship. This, along with the Maoist uprising left manager Stephen Constantine to resign.

In 2002, endeavours to develop football received a further fillip when FIFA awarded a Goal programme to Nepal. Thanks to this project, ANFA has constructed regional football centres that include hostels, office secretariats and playing grounds in three major towns in three different regions. ANFA built these centres to focus on spotting hidden talent in villages or schools around the nation. These centres will also provide the necessary coaching and physical training, and in the long-term, the nation as a whole will benefit with more regional football sides on a par with the clubs of Kathmandu.

Recent years
Nepal was fined  by the Asian Football Confederation of fielding over-age players during the 2014 AFC U-16 Championship. Since the fine, the All Nepal Football Association has put in place several necessary age checks as part of selection/trials. The most recent team has qualified for the 2016 AFC U-16 Championship, making it the first Nepal U-16 team to achieve a back-to-back qualification in history. However, the team was then excluded from the tournament due to player Manish Karki failing an MRI bone test. Nepal was penalized and ruled to have forfeited all three of their qualification group matches where the ineligible player was fielded by a 3–0 scoreline.

Stadium

The team's home ground is shared with the Nepal national football team at the Dasarath Rangasala Stadium, a multi-purpose stadium in Tripureswor, Kathmandu, Nepal. Holding 25,000 spectators, of which 5.000 seated, it is the biggest stadium in Nepal. It is named after Dashrath Chand, one of the martyrs of Nepal.

Most recently, the stadium was used as a primary venue for the 2012 AFC Challenge Cup and the 2013 SAFF Championship, with the Halchowk Stadium hosting some of the matches as well. Apart from sporting events, the stadium is also used as a music venue for cultural events with Bryan Adams being the most notable act that performed at the site.

Prior to the 2013 SAFF Championship in Nepal, the Dasarath Rangasala underwent heavy renovation that saw several improvements such as the expansion of seats from 20,000 to 25,000.

Recent results and fixtures

2010s

2000s

1990s

Coaching staff

Players

U-16 Squad
 The 23-man squad was Entered for the 2015 SAFF U-16 Championship.2016 AFC U-16 Championship

U-16 Recent Call-ups

Competitive record*Denotes draws include knockout matches decided on penalty kicks.**Red border color indicates tournament was held on home soil.''

FIFA (U-17) World Cup

In order to qualify for the FIFA U-17 World Cup, AFC teams must secure a berth (currently, semi-finals) through a continental tournament, the AFC U-16 Championship.

AFC U-16 Championship

SAFF U-16 Championship

See also

 Nepal national football team
 Nepal women's national football team
 Nepal national under-20 football team
 Football in Nepal
 AFC U-16 Championship

Notes

References

External links
 Profile on FIFA 
 GoalNepal: Nepal U-16 profile

Asian national under-17 association football teams
under-17